Motu Patlu: King of Kings is a 2016 Indian 3D computer-animated adventure comedy film directed by Suhas D. Kadav and produced by Ketan Mehta. The film was inspired by the popular TV series Motu Patlu, which itself was adapted from characters published by Lotpot magazine. It is the first feature-length film based on the characters. The film was released on 14 October 2016 and became a successful venture at the box office. It received mixed reviews from critics, who appreciated its voice performances, humor, and animation but criticized its plot, violence and editing.

Description

Motu and Patlu help a vegetarian cowardly circus lion named Guddu Ghalib who likes to eat carrots and radishes to return to the forest, where an evil poacher Narsimha dominates. Instead of leaving Guddu in the forest, they went to a national park to keep Guddu there because Patlu said that he did not know how to hunt and for this Guddu sometimes tried to escape from them. The duo make Guddu the king of the jungle, as Singha, the former king of the jungle was killed by Narsimha. Motu Patlu and their friends team up with the animals to fight him and restore peace in the jungle

Plot

The movie begins in a circus. People were crowded to see the show of a cowardly circus lion named Guddu Ghalib. The ringmaster of the circus announces the arrival of a "poet from Misaj, who only eats vegetarian food". The ringmaster introduces Guddu Ghalib, a vegetarian lion. Guddu comes on to the stage riding a unicycle, juggling carrots and radishes, and singing "Twinkle Twinkle Little Star". Above the stage, two rats are seen fighting over cheese.

The ringmaster announces that Guddu will be jumping over a ring of fire. Guddu successfully jumps over the ring and continues cycling, much to the delight of the crowd. Guddu thanks the crowd as the rats continue fighting over the cheese. One of the rats trip and falls on Guddu's nose, which scares Guddu.

Guddu and the rat start running away from each other and Guddu slams onto the pole with the ring of fire. The ring of fire falls over and starts a fire in the circus, causing chaos within the audience. Guddu also sees the fire and uses his unicycle to escape. Guddu manages to leave the circus and is forced to run from three stray dogs. Guddu notices a car with an open trunk and jumps onto it. The car and its passengers are revealed to be going to Furfuri Nagar.

The car reaches its destination, Furfuri Nagar. Guddu leaves the car and starts exploring Furfuri Nagar. He sees some kids and comes to greet them; however, the kids run away from Guddu and everyone starts running away from him. Guddu is worried and also starts running from the lion. The residents of Furfuri Nagar start running away from Guddu. Guddu realizes that the people are afraid of him and starts to willingly scare and chase the residents. Chingum tries to stop the lion but is too ridden with fear and goes up high in the space with Furfuri Nagar public on his bike, but falls down with bang. Chingum calls Motu and Patlu, only for them to inform him that they are already running away from the lion. Motu Patlu come in a very stylish way but actually they are running away from Guddu.

After running away from the lion several times, Motu notices Guddu's circus skills and assumes that Guddu is a person trying to scare people. Motu tries to tickle Guddu and to remove his "costume" but Motu doesn't realize that Guddu is the real lion. As Motu and Patlu escape, Motu finds some samosas and starts eating them. Motu starts to fight the lion and uses some sticks to trap Guddu.

Guddu is inside an actual cage, crying. Dr. Jhatka appears with an invention called the "Animal Language Translating Gadget" to help Motu and his friends understand Guddu. Motu opens the cage to give Guddu a high-five, which Guddu does. Guddu introduces himself to Motu and Patlu and asks them to take him to the jungle. Patlu realizes that Guddu wouldn't be able to survive in the jungle because he doesn't know how to hunt. Chingum informs Patlu of a national park where Guddu can stay. Guddu does not want to go to the National Park and tricks Motu and makes him understand that he fainted and runs away. Finally they find him and Guddu agrees to go to the National Park and the journey to the National Park commences.

The scene cuts to some animals in the jungle. A fawn named Heeru, a foal, and a bunny are seen playing together. Suddenly, many trucks enter the scene. The hunters on the trucks start throwing nets at many of the animals to capture them. Heeru's mother ends up getting captured. Heeru manages to escape the ordeal along with many other animals. The animals go to their king, King Singha to inform him of the ordeal. King Singha confronts the hunters and starts attacking them, along with the other animals. As the animals are about to subdue the hunters, a helicopter comes along and releases a net to capture King Singha. The man inside the helicopter, Narasimha exits the helicopter and informs the King that "they meet again". A lady, Monica steps off the plane, shooing away mosquitoes with her electric racket. Narasimha reveals that he had tried to hunt for gold the year before, only to be scared away by the King. Narasimha having captured the king, states that he would be able to gain the gold in the jungle.

The scene cuts to nighttime at Motu and Patlu's campsite. Guddu informs Motu that he does not want to go to the National Park, but stay in the jungle. Motu tries to convince Guddu otherwise only to see a glowing object. Motu follows this object and sees that it is a bird. Many similar birds fly around as well.

The scene cuts to the next day, at Narasimha's campsite. Narasimha teases King Singha and compliments the fear in the other captured animal's eyes. Narasimha starts to proclaim about how he shall destroy the jungle and be its king, which anger King Singha. King Singha escapes from his net and is about to confront Narasimha, only to see that the cage with the other captured animals is about to fall over the ledge. King Singha manages to free the captured animals just as the cage falls over the ledge. The other animals start to ambush Narasimha and his group. Narasimha and his group try to escape by helicopter, but the animals manage to push it off. Narasimha and his group manage to escape themselves by car.

The scene cuts to Motu's camp. Guddu is seen thinking about how to escape the cage. Guddu decides to pretend to be dead. This makes Motu cry and Motu goes to inform everyone, but accidentally leaves the door open, allowing Guddu to escape. Motu and friends try to chase after Guddu and one of Narasimha's henchmen, Aplu sees this and informs Narasimha that he will try to bring Motu and friends to him.

The scene cuts to Narasimha's camp and Aplu has managed to get Motu, Patlu, Chingum, Dr. Jhatka, and Ghasitaram with him.

Narasimha and his group pretend to be good people, claiming to come to the jungle for "the welfare of the people" and antagonize the king. Motu and friends, having fallen for Narasimha's acting, pursue Guddu.

The scene cuts to the next morning, Guddu is seen eating a carrot and enjoying his time. Guddu hears Motu calling and hides behind a tree.

Chugli, an informer of King Singha, notices Motu and friends and assumes that they are the hunters. Chugli informs King Singha of this. Motu and his friends are coming towards them

King Singha and his tenants are watching them, and Motu runs towards him, thinking of him as Guddu because King Singha and Guddu look absolutely the same. Motu tries to do his dance with King Singha, which further makes him angry. Motu and King Singha get into a fight. Guddu notices this and compliments the fight and Patlu realizes that Motu is fighting the wrong lion. After being informed of this, Motu starts to confront King Singha for his supposed "evil actions". As Motu and King Singha fight, King Singha tells Motu that Narasimha is a "demon disguised as a human" and tells Motu of his plans. Motu realizes that he and his friends were tricked. However, Narasimha who was watching this confrontation from his drone starts throwing missiles on them. One of the missiles hit a ledge, with the young animals standing on it. The ledge starts to fall and King Singha and Motu go on the ledge to save the animals. This is successful, but a tree falls on King Singha, trapping him. Motu tries to lift the tree but to no avail. King Singha accepts his fate and asks Motu to protect all the animals from Narasimha. The ledge breaks at this point and Patlu grabs a vine and jumps of the cliff to save Motu. Patlu manages to grab Motu and save him but he could not save King Singha. A revengeful Motu promises the now-deceased king that he would defeat Narasimha.

Narasimha observes all this from a distance in his vehicle, laughing and rejoicing over the death of the king.

The scene cuts to the jungle, where Narasimha and his group are seen chopping down trees with a machine.

They are stopped by Chingum and Motu begins to confront Narasimha. Narasimha's henchmen surround Motu and friends. Patlu laughs and informs everyone that King Singha is alive, much to the surprise of Motu and the horror of Narasimha and his group. Patlu reveals that King Singha will be arriving with his army. Narasimha says he will kill King Singha again. Motu, Patlu, Chingum, Ghasitaram, and Dr. Jhatka are captured.

In the cell, Motu punches Patlu because Patlu did not inform him about saving King Singha. Motu manages to throw Patlu against the entrance so hard that it opens. Seeing this, everyone escapes. However, they all fall down the cliff.

The scene cuts to Guddu eating dripping honey from a beehive. Suddenly, a big branch falls to the ground and Guddu runs. Motu and friends have now fallen under the water and slide down a waterfall. Guddu sees this and runs. Motu and friends leave the water and start walking, with Motu refusing to listen to Patlu because of his "betrayal."

Patlu, frustrated, reveals that King Singha did indeed die. Patlu tells everyone of his plan of having Guddu impersonate King Singha to encourage the animals. Guddu overhears this and decides to escape. Guddu trips over a log and ends up with Motu and Patlu. Guddu tries to run but is surrounded by Motu and friends.

The scene cuts to Narasimha and his group cutting down trees as the animals run. Motu is seen showing Guddu the jungle and what is happening to it. Guddu exclaims that he could never be King Singha. As Motu and friends try to encourage Guddu, he ends up collapsing due to fear.

The scene cuts to Narasimha and his group, having reached the gold mine. After blowing up some rocks, Narasimha sees the gold.

Narasimha and his group celebrate and go inside the gold mine. They marvel at all the gold and everyone begins to take some gold.

The scene cuts to a cave. Motu and Chingum are seen trying to convince Guddu to be king and help the animals. Guddu is finally convinced and agrees to help the animals. Suddenly, Guddu refuses to help due to fear. Motu tells Guddu that he will not leave Guddu until he is king. Guddu starts to compare him to the ringmaster and decides to help Motu.

The scene cuts to outside the cave, Patlu starts to introduce "King Singha". Guddu steps out of the cave and the animals bow down to him. Motu encourages the animals and tells them to get ready for war.

The scene cuts to the gold mine, Narasimha and his group are excavating the gold out of the mine. A man named Abhiskar Lal steps out a truck. Narasimha asks Lal about what invention he made. Lal tells Narasimha that his invention will be able to defeat all the animals in the jungle. Narasimha opens the truck containing the invention and gets beat up by it. Lal reveals that the invention is a hybrid between a dog and a panther, the Donther. Monica shows Narasimha Motu and Patlu's plan. Narasimha tells Abhiskar Lal to release the Donthers to fight Motu and friends. Lal shows the Donthers a picture of Guddu and tells them to attack him.

The scene cuts to the jungle. The song "Dham Dham Dham" starts as everyone prepares for the war.

The song ends and the Donthers attack all the animals. Motu and Patlu try to get Guddu to roar, which fails as Guddu ends up meowing instead. Motu tries to encourage Guddu only to realize that Guddu is having a panic attack.

Guddu starts to run with the Donthers chasing him. Motu and friends start to pursue both Guddu and the Donthers.

Guddu throws himself on a tree branch and the Donthers do the same. The added weight snaps the branch and all the Donthers fall to the ground below. However, Guddu saves himself by clinging onto a vine. Guddu manages to climb to the other side. Motu asks Guddu to come back to their side, which Guddu refuses to do. Motu tries to convince Guddu to come back, but Guddu refuses, stating that he wishes to enjoy himself independently and do things for himself. Guddu says goodbye to them and leaves. Motu acknowledges that he expected too much from Guddu.

The scene cuts to the jungle. Motu goes to the water to wash his face. Suddenly, a bunch of fish form the face of King Singha. This face encourages Motu, telling him that those who have courage will never lose. The face leaves as Motu pursues it and ends up hugging a crocodile. Motu's attempts at hugging the crocodile cause it to fear Motu and try to escape. Motu realizes that he was hugging a crocodile and releases it.

Motu and his friends start to run but are halted by Chungli and the other animals, who were angry that they had tried to replace "Singha with a circus lion". The animals start calling Motu and Patlu liars. The animals decide to leave the jungle and go someplace far away. Motu snaps, saying that he wanted Guddu to unite all the animals to fight Narasimha. The rhinoceros tells Motu that they cannot fight without Singha. Patlu tells the animals to fight or else they would soon have to run away from the next place as well. Soon all the animals, including Heeru start to join Motu and Patlu. Motu tells everyone to get ready for war.

Everyone starts to charge towards Narasimha's base. Meanwhile, Narasimha, Monica, and Abhiskar Lal are setting up a strategy to help fight Motu and friends. The defense plan is two defense lines and one secret defense line. Lal says that there will be another line of defense; his new invention, a gigantic creature, Gorrato.

The scene cuts to nighttime, Motu and friends are charging towards Narasimha's camp. Motu and Patlu observe the frontline, looking at the defenses and the offense. Motu tells the bird Anokhi to light up the camp with her friends. The light provided by the glowing birds end up making the illusion of day and Narasimha's defense plan is initiated.

The light produced from the birds wake up Guddu and he sees the animals and starts to observe the war. Patlu tells Chingum and the animals to initiate the aerial attack. The monkeys start feeding the elephants bananas, which are then blasted onto Narasimha's men. Aplu sees this and informs Narasimha of the attack, before being hit with a banana. Narasimha tells the commandos to attack. Patlu tells Chingum to initiate the "Coconut Bullets". Chingum shoots his gun and the monkeys feed the elephants the coconuts, and the coconuts falling out of the sky and being blasted hit more of Narasimha's men. The war continues, with both sides retaliating with guns, tanks, burning charcoal, and more. Narasimha demands Abhiskar Lal to release the Goratto. Lal releases the Goratto, and tells it to attack the animals.

Guddu continues to observe the war as many animals start to retreat to escape the Goratto's destructiveness. Motu and Patlu try to charge at Goratto, only to be punched away. Motu attacks Goratto, and is punched again. This time; Heeru steps up and threatens Goratto. Heeru is grabbed by Goratto and is thrown away. Heeru falls on the rock Guddu is on and mistakes Guddu for King Singha and begs him for help. Guddu steps back into the cave and told Heeru that he was not King Singha, he was Guddu.

Suddenly, Guddu is encouraged by an imaginary Motu and Patlu to help in the war. After a few words of encouragement, Guddu goes to help Motu in the war. Hearing Guddu's roar, many of the animals regain their courage and start fighting Goratto. Goratto starts fighting Guddu. Meanwhile, Motu fights Narasimha and his associates and defeat them. Goratto throws Guddu to the ground. Guddu starts to fight Goratto again. All the animals come to assist Guddu but Guddu finally delivers a kick that throws Goratto of the ledge of the cliff.

The scene cuts to the cave. Motu and Patlu deliver a speech, and the animals finally accept Guddu as their new king. The scene cuts again to Narasimha and his associates in a cell as Chingum teases them. Motu hugs Guddu. After that, Motu looks at the viewer and tells them to eat their carrots and radishes, thus ending the movie. 

During the credits, the song, "Motu Patlu Ki Jodi" is sung.

Voice cast
 Saurav Chakraborty as Motu / Patlu / Dr.Jhatka / Ghasitaram / Inspector Chingum 
 Vinay Pathak as Guddu, the circus lion
 Uday Sabnis as Narsimha, the hunter
 Vinod Kulkarni as Avishkari Lal, the scientist

Characters 
 Motu as the story's first hero, Guddu's friend and a good fighter
 Patlu as the story's second hero, Guddu's friend and a brilliant and intelligent man
 Guddu as the story's third hero, circus lion and king of a forest
 Inspector Chingum as sub inspector of Furfuri Nagar 
 Ghasitaram as an 20 years experienced person
 Dr.Jhatka as a scientist and doctor 
 Narashimha as a main villain who tries to kill Singha and searches for gold which is located in the forest's mines
 Singha as a lion who is a past king of a forest

Trivia
 The characters John, No. 1, No. 2, Boxer and Chaiwala were not featured in the movie.
 Voot Kids has this movie with a subscription.
 There is another spin-off show with Guddu being the main character: Guddu the Great.
 This is the only theatrical movie of Motu Patlu.

Release
The film was released theatrically on 14 October 2016, in 700 screens across India.

Home media 
The satellite rights of the film were sold to Nickelodeon India & Colors Network & The digital rights of the film were sold to Voot Kids. This movie was premiered on  28 May 2017 on Nickelodeon & 4 June 2017 on Nickelodeon Sonic. The digital rights was sold to Netflix initially, but got taken out & is now on Voot Kids, India’s number one kids show streaming platform.

Reception
The Times of India gave the film 3 stars. DNA gave the film 2 stars. Economic Times gave the film 3 stars.

See also
 Indian animation industry
 List of Indian animated films

References

External links

2010s children's comedy films
Indian animated films
Indian 3D films
2016 3D films
2016 computer-animated films
2010s Hindi-language films
Films based on television series
2016 animated films
2016 films
Animated films based on animated series
Animated films about lions
Viacom18 Studios films
Motu Patlu
Animated films based on comics
2010s children's animated films
Nickelodeon animated films
Nickelodeon India
Indian computer-animated films
Films based on Indian comics
2016 comedy films
2010s American films